Jiefang Bridge (literally “Liberation Bridge”) is a bridge in Guangzhou, China. The bridge connects the Haizhu District with the Yuexiu District, and is one of nine bridges connecting Haizhu with downtown Guangzhou and the business districts. On its north side is Jiefang South Rd (解放南路) and on its south side is Tongqing Rd (同庆路).

Guangzhou's annual Dragon Boat Race takes place between Jiefang Bridge and Renmin Bridge.

References

Bridges in Guangzhou
Bridges over the Pearl River (China)
Bridges completed in 1998